Kluang Airport  (known as Kem Mahkota) is an airport in Kluang District, Johor, Malaysia.

See also
 List of airports in Malaysia

References

Airports in Johor
Kluang District